United We Stand SC is a U.S. Virgin Islands based soccer club that regularly competes in the U.S. Virgin Islands Association Club Championship, and has had success. The team competes in the St. Thomas League and the U.S. Virgin Islands Association Club Championship on a yearly basis.

Honours
U.S. Virgin Islands Association Club Championship:
Champions (1): 1999-00
Runners-up (3): 2001-02, 2018-19, 2022-23
St. Thomas League:
Champions (2): 1999–00, 2000–01

References

Soccer clubs in the United States Virgin Islands
1990 establishments in the United States Virgin Islands
Association football clubs established in 1990